Mesmer may refer to:

People
 Franz Anton Mesmer (1734–1815), German doctor who postulated Animal magnetism, and for whom Mesmerism is named
 Sharon Mesmer, American writer born 1960 in Chicago, Illinois
 Gustav Mesmer, inventor of experimental human-powered flying machines
 Mesmer family of California, early settlers and developers of Los Angeles

Other
 Mesmer (film), a 1994 film about the above
 Mesmer, a concept in the List of concepts in Artemis Fowl
 Mesmer (album), a 2017 album by the Australian band Northlane

See also 
 Messmer (disambiguation)